In 1966, Bantam Books acquired the license to publish tie-in fiction based on the science fiction television series Star Trek.

Bantam published a series of novelizations based on episodes of the television series from 1967 to 1978. From 1970 to 1981, a range of original novels, anthologies, and reference books followed. Bantam also produced a line of photo comics which adapted popular episodes of the television series using full-color photographic stills.

Many of Bantam's Star Trek releases remained in print until 1991.

Production

Episode novelizations 
James Blish was known to have expressed an extreme dislike for tie-in fiction; however, he accepted the commission from Bantam Books to novelize episodes of Star Trek, at $2,000 per volume. He later stated his financial stability stemmed from the publication of the novelizations, which likely included the commission for Spock Must Die! (1970), which earned him a $3,000 advance.

Prior to his relocation to the United Kingdom in 1969, Blish had not seen the NBC broadcasts of Star Trek. Nor was he involved in the production of the series in any capacity. His only sources for the adaptations were the draft teleplays sent to him by Desilu. Adaptations published after 1970 aligned more with the narrative tone and pacing from the television series, indicating Blish had seen some episodes. Mostly likely via broadcasts by the BBC, which began the summer of 1969.

Blish was credited exclusively for eleven volumes, although it was later acknowledged that volumes published after Star Trek 6 (1972) were written in collaboration with his wife J. A. Lawrence and her mother, Muriel Lawrence, who was also Blish's assistant. Blish commented favorably about the series in each of his "Author's Notes", however, Josephine Saxton said Blish was "so affected to despise" Star Trek that he did not write any of Star Trek 10 (1974). Blish's personal feelings regarding the merit of Star Trek were expressed by the pun "an enterprise so well conceived" in the "Author's Note" of Spock Must Die!.

Bantam editor Frederik Pohl was unaware of the Lawrences' contributions until sometime in 1973. Star Trek 12 (1977), published after Blish's death in 1975, was co-credited to J. A. Lawrence.

Adaptations of episodes involving the character Harry Mudd were reserved by Blish for inclusion in an original novel, possibly a follow up to Spock Must Die! However, it is unknown if the book was ever realized. The novelizations of "Mudd's Women" and "I, Mudd" were collected as Mudd's Angels (1978), which included an original novella by Lawrence: The Business, as Usual, During Altercations. Lawrence confirmed the Mudd novelizations were written by Blish, and not by her.

Photo comics 
In 1977, Bantam published the first volume in a series of full-color, photo comics adapting twelve popular episodes. Marketed as a Star Trek Fotonovel, each novel utilized still frames taken from film master of each episode. A format advertised as "action photographs". The images were then overlaid with speech bubbles, with typeset text for dialogue, thoughts and action. Many scenes are either condensed, removed, or altered to fit the available space. Mandala Productions, who produced the series, said their goal was to publish "accurate and faithful recreations" of the episodes. The series included novelizations of "The City on the Edge of Forever" and "Amok Time", all credited to the original teleplay writers.

Original novels 
Frederik Pohl was given control of Bantam's Star Trek line in 1972, but he later admitted to not paying much attention to the television series, or the book line. When Joe Haldeman asked who was responsible for new Star Trek novels, Pohl answered "You are!" According to Stephen Goldin, Pohl recruited writers who he felt were dependable enough "to do Star Trek." Among the first writers Pohl reached out to was his long-time friend Theodore Cogswell, whom he tasked with getting the crew of the Enterprise "off the damned ship!"

The second original novel, Spock, Messiah!, by Cogswell and Charles Spano, was published in September 1976. The Price of the Phoenix, by Sondra Marshak and Myrna Culbreath, and Planet of Judgment, by Joe Haldeman, followed in 1977.

After completing his second Star Trek novel, World Without End (1979), Haldeman was "fed up…" and left the Star Trek "enterprise" at "warp factor five". Haldeman said he wrote his first novel to explore writing when all the "characters are already known to the readers," but did not expect to do a second. In an interview with Fast Forward, Haldeman said that despite his desire to write for Star Trek, he did not feel he could conform to the process of writing tie-in fiction.

Other writers recruited by Pohl felt differently about their experience. Gordon Eklund said that Star Trek left room "for just about anything you might want to write." Kathleen Sky, who wrote Vulcan! (1978) and Death's Angel (1981), said Paramount and Pohl made very few requests, except to add "more aliens" and for the last novel to give "Kirk a romance."

Short fiction and reference works 

Writer Jacqueline Lichtenberg had begun research on the Star Trek phenomenon and fandom in the early 1970s. Her intention was to write a newspaper feature on the subject, but her research amassed enough material for a reference work. A query package was assembled and submitted to the major publishers, but the query was rejected by all, including Bantam Books. Following a delay in the production of a new novel from James Blish, Frederik Pohl acquired the query. After two years of additional research, drafting and rewrites, Star Trek Lives! was published in 1975. A sequel has been suggested by Lichtenberg, but has never been realized.

Star Trek Lives! was a bestseller, and Pohl began exploring the possibility of publishing an anthology of fan-written stories based on the television series. Fan fiction was explored in the last chapter of Star Trek Lives!, and co-writer Sondra Marshak, along with her writing partner Myrna Culbreath, had collected a number of fan-written stories to potentially anthologize. Pohl eventually encouraged Marshak and Culbreath to move forward with an anthology after persuading Paramount Pictures such a book would be "impeccably professional." The New Voyages was published in 1976, and collected nine short stories, all had been previously published in Star Trek fanzines, such as T-Negative and Spockanalia. A second volume, The New Voyages 2, was published in 1978, which included a short story written by Nichelle Nichols. Additional volumes were announced by Marshak and Culbreath, but none were published.

Star Trek Maps, designed by Jeffrey Maynard, was published by Bantam in 1980. The box set included four four-color wall maps, and a detailed instructional booklet demonstrating the navigation system utilized by the television series. Highly praised, the charts received special mention during the 1992 Star Trek Exhibition presented by the National Air & Space Museum.

Reprints and cover art 
The novelizations by Blish and Lawrence were reprinted many times, often with new cover art. The first volume, Star Trek 1, received twenty-nine printings between 1967 and 1980; the cover art was originally created by illustrator James Bama as part of an advertising campaign for NBC. Star Trek 11 was reprinted as Day of the Dove in 1985, along with the entire range of original novels, with new cover art by Eric Torres-Prat.

From 1993 to 2000, the original novels and The New Voyages anthologies were reprinted by Spectra, featuring cover art by Japanese artist Kazuhiko Sano. Mudd's Angels was reprinted as Mudd's Enterprise as part of that run.

The adaptations and original novels have been translated and reprinted by various other publishers in Western Europe, Japan, Turkey and Israel.

License and rights 
The license for tie-in fiction was awarded to Pocket Books sometime prior to the release of the novelization of Star Trek: The Motion Picture (1979). However, three original novels, and one reference book, Star Trek Maps (1980), were published by Bantam following this change. Pocket Books opened their own line of original novels with the release of The Entropy Effect (1981), by Vonda N. McIntyre. None of the lines created by Bantam were continued.

The copyrights to the episode novelizations, photo comics, and original novels are now held by CBS. , none of Bantam's Star Trek titles are available in electronic formats. All titles are out of print.

The copyright and publishing rights for Star Trek Lives! have since reverted to the original authors. Lichtenberg has attempted to release the book in electronic formats. However, she has been unable to gain the necessary permissions from her co-writers, or in the case of Joan Winston, her estate.

Bibliography

Episode novelizations (1967–1994) 
Collected adaptations of the Original Series episodes:

Original novels (1970–1981) 
The series is cataloged as Star Trek Adventures by book discovery sites, such as Goodreads. Bantam never applied a series name to the novels, instead marketing each volume as a "new Star Trek adventure". The novels are not numbered. Library catalogs have applied numbers to the series in the past.

Reference works (1975–1980)

New Voyages (1976–1977) 
Star Trek: The New Voyages collects fan fiction curated and edited by Sondra Marshak and Myrna Culbreath. Additional volumes were announced, but none were published. Pocket Books's Strange New Worlds (1998–2016), edited by Dean Wesley Smith, is similar.

Star Trek Fotonovel (1977–78) 
Photo comics:

Classic Episodes (1991) 
Star Trek: The Classic Episodes omnibus edition collected the novelizations in three volumes. Unlike previous editions the episodes are sorted by television series season. New material by D. C. Fontana, Norman Spinrad, and others was also included. The novelizations of "Mudd's Women" and "I, Mudd" were not included, nor was Lawrence's original novella, The Business, as Usual, During Altercations.

Related works

Star Trek Reader (1976–1978) 
The episode novelizations by Blish, including Spock Must Die! (1970), were collected in a four volume omnibus published by E. P. Dutton. Variants were also made available to the Science Fiction Book Club.

Titan Books reprints (1992–1995) 
Reprints intended for the U.K. and AustralianNew Zealand markets.

New Voyages reprints (1992) 
Reprints of Star Trek: The New Voyages short story collections edited by Sondra Marshak and Myrna Culbreath. Both volumes include significant spelling corrections and unexplained prose changes.

Star Trek Adventures (1993–1995) 
 Bantam Book's original novels were reprinted by Titan as Star Trek Adventures. The series name has since been erroneously applied to the Bantam editions by book discovery websites. The novels include significant corrections and spelling changes. Not all printings include a number stamp.

Classic Episodes (2016) 
Star Trek: The Classic Episodes is an omnibus edition of the Blish and Lawrence novelizations. Published by Barnes & Noble in 2016 as part of the Collectible Editions series.

See also 
 List of Star Trek novels
 List of Star Trek reference books
 Star Trek Log

Notes

References

External links 
 
 

Books based on Star Trek
Bantam Books books